Dyssodia is a small genus of flowering plants in the family Asteraceae. Many species formerly included in Dyssodia are now treated as members of other related genera, including Thymophylla or Adenophyllum. Dyssodia papposa is usually retained in this genus.  The name is derived from the Greek δυσοδια (dusodia), meaning "ill-smelling".

Several species of Dyssodia (sensu lato) have found their way into the nursery trade and are relatively popular flowering annuals for hot, dry sites.  Generally sold as threadleaf dyssodia (Dyssodia tenuisecta) and golden dyssodia (Dyssodia cf. pentachaeta).  They perform best in well-drained soil.

Phytochemistry
Two species of the genus, D. acerosa and D. pentachaeta have been studied for their essential oil content.

Selected species
Dyssodia decipiens (Bartl.) M.C.Johnst. ex M.C.Johnst. & B.L.Turner
Dyssodia greggii (A.Gray) B.L.Rob.
Dyssodia montana (Benth.) A.Gray
Dyssodia papposa (Vent.) Hitchc. — fetid marigold
Dyssodia pinnata (Cav.) B.L.Rob.
Dyssodia porophyllum (Cav.) Cav.
Dyssodia tagetiflora Lag.

Formerly placed here
Adenophyllum wrightii A.Gray (as D. neomexicana (A.Gray) B.L.Rob.)
Thymophylla acerosa (DC.) Strother (as D. acerosa DC.)
Thymophylla aurantiaca (Brandegee) Rydb. (as D. aurantiaca (Brandegee) B.L.Rob.)
Thymophylla pentachaeta (DC.) Small (as D. pentachaeta (DC.) B.L.Rob.)
Thymophylla tenuiloba (DC.) Small (as D. tenuiloba (DC.) B.L.Rob.)
Thymophylla tephroleuca (S.F.Blake) Strother (as D. tephroleuca S.F.Blake)

References

External links
Jepson Manual Treatment
USDA Plants Profile

Tageteae
Asteraceae genera
Taxa named by Antonio José Cavanilles